St Saviour's Church, Villa Street, Hockley is a former Church of England parish church in Birmingham.

History

The church was designed by J. A. Chatwin and the contractor was W. Partridge of Monument Lane, Birmingham. It was consecrated on 2 May 1874 by the Bishop of Worcester. The church consisted of a 5 bay nave, north and south aisles, chancel, and a west end tower and spire, reaching to a height of 126 ft.

A parish was assigned out of St Matthias' Church, Farm Street, Birmingham.

In 1967 the parish was united with St Silas’ Church, Lozells, and the church was demolished

References

Church of England church buildings in Birmingham, West Midlands
Churches completed in 1874
Saviour